The Maurya Empire, or the Mauryan Empire, was a geographically extensive Iron Age historical power on the Indian subcontinent based in Magadha, having been founded by Chandragupta Maurya in 322 BCE, and existing in loose-knit fashion until 185 BCE. The Maurya Empire was centralized by the conquest of the Indo-Gangetic Plain, and its capital city was located at Pataliputra (modern Patna). Outside this imperial center, the empire's geographical extent was dependent on the loyalty of military commanders who controlled the armed cities sprinkling it. During Ashoka's rule (ca. 268–232 BCE) the empire briefly controlled the major urban hubs and arteries of the Indian subcontinent except those in the deep south. It declined for about 50 years after Ashoka's rule, and dissolved in 185 BCE with the assassination of Brihadratha by Pushyamitra Shunga and the foundation of the Shunga Empire in Magadha.

Chandragupta Maurya raised an army, with the assistance of Chanakya, his teacher and the author of Arthashastra, and overthrew the Nanda Empire, in  thus laying the foundation for the Maurya Empire. Chandragupta rapidly expanded his power westwards across central and western India by defeating the satraps left by Alexander the Great, and by 317 BCE the empire had fully occupied northwestern India. The Mauryan Empire then defeated Seleucus I Nicator, a diadochus and founder of the Seleucid Empire, during the Seleucid–Mauryan war, thus acquiring territory west of the Indus River, Afghanistan and Balochistan.

Under the Mauryas, internal and external trade, agriculture, and economic activities thrived and expanded across South Asia due to the creation of a single and efficient system of finance, administration, and security. The Maurya dynasty built a precursor of the Grand Trunk Road from Pataliputra to Taxila. After the Kalinga War, the Empire experienced nearly half a century of centralized rule under Ashoka. Ashoka's embrace of Buddhism and sponsorship of Buddhist missionaries allowed for the expansion of that faith into Sri Lanka, northwest India, and Central Asia.

The population of South Asia during the Mauryan period has been estimated to be between 15 and 30 million. 
The empire's period of dominion was marked by exceptional creativity in art, architecture, inscriptions and produced texts, but also by the consolidation of caste in the Gangetic plain, and the declining rights of women in the mainstream Indo-Aryan speaking regions of India. 
Archaeologically, the period of Mauryan rule in South Asia falls into the era of Northern Black Polished Ware (NBPW). The Arthashastra and the Edicts of Ashoka are the primary sources of written records of Mauryan times. The Lion Capital of Ashoka at Sarnath is the national emblem of the Republic of India.

Etymology 

The name "Maurya" does not occur in Ashoka's inscriptions, or the contemporary Greek accounts such as Megasthenes's Indica, but it is attested by the following sources:

The Junagadh rock inscription of Rudradaman (c. 150 CE) prefixes "Maurya" to the names Chandragupta and Ashoka.
 The Puranas (c. 4th century CE or earlier) use Maurya as a dynastic appellation.
 The Buddhist texts state that Chandragupta belonged to the "Moriya" clan of the Shakyas, the tribe to which Gautama Buddha belonged.
 The Jain texts state that Chandragupta was the son of a royal superintendent of peacocks (mayura-poshaka).
Tamil Sangam literature also designate them as '' and mention them after the Nandas
Kuntala inscription (from the town of Bandanikke, North Mysore ) of 12th century AD chronologically mention Mauryya as one of the dynasties which ruled the region.

According to some scholars, Kharavela' Hathigumpha inscription (2nd-1st century BC) mentions era of Maurya Empire as Muriya Kala (Mauryan era), but this reading is disputed: other scholars—such as epigraphist D. C. Sircar—read the phrase as mukhiya-kala ("the principal art").

According to the Buddhist tradition, the ancestors of the Maurya kings had settled in a region where peacocks (mora in Pali) were abundant. Therefore, they came to be known as "Moriyas", literally meaning, "belonging to the place of peacocks". According to another Buddhist account, these ancestors built a city called Moriya-nagara ("Moriya-city"), which was so called, because it was built with the "bricks coloured like peacocks' necks".

The dynasty's connection to the peacocks, as mentioned in the Buddhist and Jain traditions, seems to be corroborated by archaeological evidence. For example, peacock figures are found on the Ashoka pillar at Nandangarh and several sculptures on the Great Stupa of Sanchi. Based on this evidence, modern scholars theorize that the peacock may have been the dynasty's emblem.

Some later authors, such as Dhundhi-raja (an 18th-century commentator on the Mudrarakshasa and an annotator of the Vishnu Purana), state that the word "Maurya" is derived from Mura and the mother of the first Maurya king. However, the Puranas themselves make no mention of Mura and do not talk of any relation between the Nanda and the Maurya dynasties. Dhundiraja's derivation of the word seems to be his own invention: according to the Sanskrit rules, the derivative of the feminine name Mura (IAST: Murā) would be "Maureya"; the term "Maurya" can only be derived from the masculine "Mura".

History

Founding

Prior to the Maurya Empire, the Nanda Empire ruled over a broad swathe of the Indian subcontinent. The Nanda Empire was a large, militaristic, and economically powerful empire due to conquering the Mahajanapadas. According to several legends, Chanakya travelled to Pataliputra, Magadha, the capital of the Nanda Empire where Chanakya worked for the Nandas as a minister. However, Chanakya was insulted by the Emperor Dhana Nanda of the Nanda dynasty when he informed them of Alexander's invasion. Chanakya swore revenge and vowed to destroy the Nanda Empire. He had to flee in order to save his life and went to Taxila, a notable center of learning, to work as a teacher. On one of his travels, Chanakya witnessed some young men playing a rural game practicing a pitched battle. One of the boys was none other than Chandragupta. Chanakya was impressed by the young Chandragupta and saw royal qualities in him as someone fit to rule.

Meanwhile, Alexander the Great was leading his Indian campaigns and ventured into Punjab. His army mutinied at the Beas River and refused to advance farther eastward when confronted by another army. Alexander returned to Babylon and re-deployed most of his troops west of the Indus River. Soon after Alexander died in Babylon in 323 BCE, his empire fragmented into independent kingdoms led by his generals.

The Maurya Empire was established in the Magadha region under the leadership of Chandragupta Maurya and his mentor Chanakya. Chandragupta was taken to Taxila by Chanakya and was tutored about statecraft and governing. Requiring an army Chandragupta recruited and annexed local military republics such as the Yaudheyas that had resisted Alexanders Empire. The Mauryan army quickly rose to become the prominent regional power in the North West of the Indian subcontinent. The Mauryan army then conquered the satraps established by the Macedonians. Ancient Greek historians Nearchus, Onesictrius, and Aristobolus have provided lot of information about the Mauryan empire. The Greek generals Eudemus and Peithon ruled in the Indus Valley until around 317 BCE, when Chandragupta Maurya (with the help of Chanakya, who was now his advisor) fought and drove out the Greek governors, and subsequently brought the Indus Valley under the control of his new seat of power in Magadha.

Chandragupta Maurya's ancestry is shrouded in mystery and controversy. On one hand, a number of ancient Indian accounts, such as the drama Mudrarakshasa (Signet ring of Rakshasa – Rakshasa was the prime minister of Magadha) by Vishakhadatta, describe his royal ancestry and even link him with the Nanda family. A kshatriya clan known as the Mauryas are referred to in the earliest Buddhist texts, Mahaparinibbana Sutta. However, any conclusions are hard to make without further historical evidence. Chandragupta first emerges in Greek accounts as "Sandrokottos". As a young man he is said to have met Alexander. Chanakya is said to have met the Nanda king, angered him, and made a narrow escape.

Conquest of the Nanda Empire

Historically reliable details of Chandragupta's campaign against Nanda Empire are unavailable and legends written centuries later are inconsistent. Buddhist, Jain, and Hindu texts claim Magadha was ruled by the Nanda dynasty, which, with Chanakya's counsel, Chandragupta conquered Nanda Empire. The army of Chandragupta and Chanakya first conquered the Nanda outer territories, and finally besieged the Nanda capital Pataliputra. In contrast to the easy victory in Buddhist sources, the Hindu and Jain texts state that the campaign was bitterly fought because the Nanda dynasty had a powerful and well-trained army.

The Buddhist Mahavamsa Tika and Jain Parishishtaparvan records Chandragupta's army unsuccessfully attacking the Nanda capital.  Chandragupta and Chanakya then began a campaign at the frontier of the Nanda empire, gradually conquering various territories on their way to the Nanda capital. He then refined his strategy by establishing garrisons in the conquered territories, and finally besieged the Nanda capital Pataliputra. There Dhana Nanda accepted defeat. The conquest was fictionalised in Mudrarakshasa play, it contains narratives not found in other versions of the Chanakya-Chandragupta legend. Because of this difference, Thomas Trautmann suggests that most of it is fictional or legendary, without any historical basis. Radha Kumud Mukherjee similarly considers Mudrakshasa play without historical basis.

These legends state that the Nanda king was defeated, deposed and exiled by some accounts, while Buddhist accounts claim he was killed. With the defeat of Dhana Nanda, Chandragupta Maurya founded the Maurya Empire.

Chandragupta Maurya

After the death of Alexander the Great in 323 BCE, Chandragupta led a series of campaigns in 305 BCE to take satrapies in the Indus Valley and northwest India. When Alexander's remaining forces were routed, returning westwards, Seleucus I Nicator fought to defend these territories. Not many details of the campaigns are known from ancient sources. Seleucus was defeated and retreated into the mountainous region of Afghanistan.

The two rulers concluded a peace treaty in 303 BCE, including a marital alliance. Under its terms, Chandragupta received the satrapies of Paropamisadae (Kamboja and Gandhara) and Arachosia (Kandhahar) and Gedrosia (Balochistan). Seleucus I received the 500 war elephants that were to have a decisive role in his victory against western Hellenistic kings at the Battle of Ipsus in 301 BCE. Diplomatic relations were established and several Greeks, such as the historian Megasthenes, Deimakos and Dionysius resided at the Mauryan court.

Megasthenes in particular was a notable Greek ambassador in the court of Chandragupta Maurya. His book Indika is a major literary source for information about the Mauryan Empire. According to Arrian, ambassador Megasthenes (c. 350 – c. 290 BCE) lived in Arachosia and travelled to Pataliputra. Megasthenes' description of Mauryan society as freedom-loving gave Seleucus a means to avoid invasion, however, underlying Seleucus' decision was the improbability of success. In later years, Seleucus' successors maintained diplomatic relations with the Empire based on similar accounts from returning travellers.

Chandragupta established a strong centralised state with an administration at Pataliputra, which, according to Megasthenes, was "surrounded by a wooden wall pierced by 64 gates and 570 towers". Aelian, although not expressly quoting Megasthenes nor mentioning Pataliputra, described Indian palaces as superior in splendor to Persia's Susa or Ecbatana. The architecture of the city seems to have had many similarities with Persian cities of the period.

Chandragupta's son Bindusara extended the rule of the Mauryan empire towards southern India. The famous Tamil poet Mamulanar of the Sangam literature described how areas south of the Deccan Plateau which comprised Tamil country was invaded by the Maurya army using troops from Karnataka. Mamulanar states that Vadugar (people who resided in Andhra-Karnataka regions immediately to the north of Tamil Nadu) formed the vanguard of the Mauryan army. He also had a Greek ambassador at his court, named Deimachus. According to Plutarch, Chandragupta Maurya subdued all of India, and Justin also observed that Chandragupta Maurya was "in possession of India". These accounts are corroborated by Tamil sangam literature which mentions about Mauryan invasion with their south Indian allies and defeat of their rivals at Podiyil hill in Tirunelveli district in present-day Tamil Nadu.

Chandragupta renounced his throne and followed Jain teacher Bhadrabahu. He is said to have lived as an ascetic at Shravanabelagola for several years before fasting to death, as per the Jain practice of sallekhana.

Bindusara

Bindusara was born to Chandragupta, the founder of the Mauryan Empire. This is attested by several sources, including the various Puranas and the Mahavamsa. He is attested by the Buddhist texts such as Dipavamsa and Mahavamsa ("Bindusaro"); the Jain texts such as Parishishta-Parvan; as well as the Hindu texts such as Vishnu Purana ("Vindusara"). According to the 12th century Jain writer Hemachandra's Parishishta-Parvan, the name of Bindusara's mother was Durdhara. Some Greek sources also mention him by the name "Amitrochates" or its variations.

Historian Upinder Singh estimates that Bindusara ascended the throne around 297 BCE. Bindusara, just 22 years old, inherited a large empire that consisted of what is now, Northern, Central and Eastern parts of India along with parts of Afghanistan and Baluchistan. Bindusara extended this empire to the southern part of India, as far as what is now known as Karnataka. He brought sixteen states under the Mauryan Empire and thus conquered almost all of the Indian peninsula (he is said to have conquered the 'land between the two seas' – the peninsular region between the Bay of Bengal and the Arabian Sea). Bindusara did not conquer the friendly Tamil kingdoms of the Cholas, ruled by King Ilamcetcenni, the Pandyas, and Cheras. Apart from these southern states, Kalinga (modern Odisha) was the only kingdom in India that did not form part of Bindusara's empire. It was later conquered by his son Ashoka, who served as the viceroy of Ujjaini during his father's reign, which highlights the importance of the town.

Bindusara's life has not been documented as well as that of his father Chandragupta or of his son Ashoka. Chanakya continued to serve as prime minister during his reign. According to the medieval Tibetan scholar Taranatha who visited India, Chanakya helped Bindusara "to destroy the nobles and kings of the sixteen kingdoms and thus to become absolute master of the territory between the eastern and western oceans". During his rule, the citizens of Taxila revolted twice. The reason for the first revolt was the maladministration of Susima, his eldest son. The reason for the second revolt is unknown, but Bindusara could not suppress it in his lifetime. It was crushed by Ashoka after Bindusara's death.

Bindusara maintained friendly diplomatic relations with the Hellenic world. Deimachus was the ambassador of Seleucid emperor Antiochus I at Bindusara's court. Diodorus states that the king of Palibothra (Pataliputra, the Mauryan capital) welcomed a Greek author, Iambulus. This king is usually identified as Bindusara. Pliny states that the Egyptian king Philadelphus sent an envoy named Dionysius to India. According to Sailendra Nath Sen, this appears to have happened during Bindusara's reign.

Unlike his father Chandragupta (who at a later stage converted to Jainism), Bindusara believed in the Ajivika sect. Bindusara's guru Pingalavatsa (Janasana) was a Brahmin of the Ajivika sect. Bindusara's wife, Queen Subhadrangi (Queen Dharma/ Aggamahesi) was a Brahmin also of the Ajivika sect from Champa (present Bhagalpur district). Bindusara is credited with giving several grants to Brahmin monasteries (Brahmana-bhatto).

Historical evidence suggests that Bindusara died in the 270s BCE. According to Upinder Singh, Bindusara died around 273 BCE. Alain Daniélou believes that he died around 274 BCE. Sailendra Nath Sen believes that he died around 273–272 BCE, and that his death was followed by a four-year struggle of succession, after which his son Ashoka became the emperor in 269–268 BCE. According to the Mahavamsa, Bindusara reigned for 28 years. The Vayu Purana, which names Chandragupta's successor as "Bhadrasara", states that he ruled for 25 years.

Ashoka

As a young prince, Ashoka ( BCE) was a brilliant commander who crushed revolts in Ujjain and Taxila. As monarch he was ambitious and aggressive, re-asserting the Empire's superiority in southern and western India. But it was his conquest of Kalinga (262–261 BCE) which proved to be the pivotal event of his life. Ashoka used Kalinga to project power over a large region by building a fortification there and securing it as a possession. Although Ashoka's army succeeded in overwhelming Kalinga forces of royal soldiers and civilian units, an estimated 100,000 soldiers and civilians were killed in the furious warfare, including over 10,000 of Ashoka's own men. Hundreds of thousands of people were adversely affected by the destruction and fallout of war. When he personally witnessed the devastation, Ashoka began feeling remorse. Although the annexation of Kalinga was completed, Ashoka embraced the teachings of Buddhism, and renounced war and violence. He sent out missionaries to travel around Asia and spread Buddhism to other countries. He also propogated his own dhamma.

Ashoka implemented principles of ahimsa by banning hunting and violent sports activity and ending indentured and forced labor (many thousands of people in war-ravaged Kalinga had been forced into hard labour and servitude). While he maintained a large and powerful army, to keep the peace and maintain authority, Ashoka expanded friendly relations with states across Asia and Europe, and he sponsored Buddhist missions. He undertook a massive public works building campaign across the country. Over 40 years of peace, harmony and prosperity made Ashoka one of the most successful and famous monarchs in Indian history. He remains an idealized figure of inspiration in modern India.

The Edicts of Ashoka, set in stone, are found throughout the Subcontinent. Ranging from as far west as Afghanistan and as far south as Andhra (Nellore District), Ashoka's edicts state his policies and accomplishments. Although predominantly written in Prakrit, two of them were written in Greek, and one in both Greek and Aramaic. Ashoka's edicts refer to the Greeks, Kambojas, and Gandharas as peoples forming a frontier region of his empire. They also attest to Ashoka's having sent envoys to the Greek rulers in the West as far as the Mediterranean. The edicts precisely name each of the rulers of the Hellenic world at the time such as Amtiyoko (Antiochus), Tulamaya (Ptolemy), Amtikini (Antigonos), Maka (Magas) and Alikasudaro (Alexander) as recipients of Ashoka's proselytism. The Edicts also accurately locate their territory "600 yojanas away" (a yojanas being about 7 miles), corresponding to the distance between the center of India and Greece (roughly 4,000 miles).

Decline
Ashoka was followed for 50 years by a succession of weaker kings. He was succeeded by Dasharatha Maurya, who was Ashoka's grandson. None of Ashoka's sons could ascend to the throne after him. Mahinda, his firstborn, became a Buddhist monk. Kunala Maurya was blind and hence couldn't ascend to the throne; and Tivala, son of Kaurwaki, died even earlier than Ashoka. Little is known about another son, Jalauka.

The empire lost many territories under Dasharatha, which were later reconquered by Samprati, Kunala's son. Post Samprati, the Mauryas slowly lost many territories. In 180 BCE, Brihadratha Maurya, was killed by his general Pushyamitra Shunga in a military parade without any heir. Hence, the great Maurya empire finally ended, giving rise to the Shunga Empire.

Reasons advanced for the decline include the succession of weak kings after Aśoka Maurya, the partition of the empire into two, the growing independence of some areas within the empire, such as that ruled by Sophagasenus, a top-heavy administration where authority was entirely in the hands of a few persons, an absence of any national consciousness, the pure scale of the empire making it unwieldy, and invasion by the Greco-Bactrian Empire.

Some historians, such as H. C. Raychaudhuri, have argued that Ashoka's pacifism undermined the "military backbone" of the Maurya empire. Others, such as Romila Thapar, have suggested that the extent and impact of his pacifism have been "grossly exaggerated".

Shunga coup (185 BCE)
Buddhist records such as the Ashokavadana write that the assassination of Brihadratha and the rise of the Shunga empire led to a wave of religious persecution for Buddhists, and a resurgence of Hinduism. According to Sir John Marshall, Pushyamitra may have been the main author of the persecutions, although later Shunga kings seem to have been more supportive of Buddhism. Other historians, such as Etienne Lamotte and Romila Thapar, among others, have argued that archaeological evidence in favour of the allegations of persecution of Buddhists are lacking, and that the extent and magnitude of the atrocities have been exaggerated.

Establishment of the Indo-Greek Kingdom (180 BCE)

The fall of the Mauryas left the Khyber Pass unguarded, and a wave of foreign invasion followed. The Greco-Bactrian king, Demetrius, capitalized on the break-up, and he conquered southern Afghanistan and parts of northwestern India around 180 BCE, forming the Indo-Greek Kingdom. The Indo-Greeks would maintain holdings on the trans-Indus region, and make forays into central India, for about a century. Under them, Buddhism flourished, and one of their kings, Menander, became a famous figure of Buddhism; he was to establish a new capital of Sagala, the modern city of Sialkot. However, the extent of their domains and the lengths of their rule are subject to much debate. Numismatic evidence indicates that they retained holdings in the subcontinent right up to the birth of Christ. Although the extent of their successes against indigenous powers such as the Shungas, Satavahanas, and Kalingas are unclear, what is clear is that Scythian tribes, renamed Indo-Scythians, brought about the demise of the Indo-Greeks from around 70 BCE and retained lands in the trans-Indus, the region of Mathura, and Gujarat.

Military 
Megasthenes mentions military command consisting of six boards of five members each, (i) Navy (ii) military transport (iii) Infantry (iv) Cavalry with Catapults (v) Chariot divisions and (vi) Elephants.

Administration

The Empire was divided into four provinces, with the imperial capital at Pataliputra. From Ashokan edicts, the names of the four provincial capitals are Tosali (in the east), Ujjain (in the west), Suvarnagiri (in the south), and Taxila (in the north). The head of the provincial administration was the Kumara (royal prince), who governed the provinces as king's representative. The kumara was assisted by Mahamatyas and council of ministers. This organizational structure was reflected at the imperial level with the Emperor and his Mantriparishad (Council of Ministers).. The mauryans established a well developed coin minting system. Coins were mostly made of silver and copper. Certain gold coins were in circulation as well. The coins were widely used for trade and commerce

Historians theorise that the organisation of the Empire was in line with the extensive bureaucracy described by Chanakya in the Arthashastra: a sophisticated civil service governed everything from municipal hygiene to international trade. The expansion and defense of the empire was made possible by what appears to have been one of the largest armies in the world during the Iron Age. According to Megasthenes, the empire wielded a military of 600,000 infantry, 30,000 cavalry, 8,000 chariots and 9,000 war elephants besides followers and attendants. A vast espionage system collected intelligence for both internal and external security purposes. Having renounced offensive warfare and expansionism, Ashoka nevertheless continued to maintain this large army, to protect the Empire and instil stability and peace across West and South Asia..Even though large parts were under the control of  Mauryan empire the spread of information and imperial message was limited since many parts were inaccessible and were situated far away from capital of empire.

The economy of the empire has been described as, "a socialized monarchy", "a sort of state socialism", and the world's first welfare state. Under the Mauryan system there was no private ownership of land as all land was owned by the king to whom tribute was paid by the by the laboring class.  In return the emperor supplied the laborers with agricultural products, animals, seeds, tools, public infrastructure, and stored food in reserve for times of crisis.

Local government 
Arthashastra and Megasthenes accounts of Pataliputra describe the intricate municipal system formed by Maurya empire to govern its cities. A city counsel made up of thirty commissioners was divided into six committees or boards which governed the city. The first board fixed wages and looked after provided goods, second board made arrangement for foreign dignitaries, tourists and businessmen, third board made records and registrations, fourth looked after manufactured goods and sale of commodities, fifth board regulated trade, issued licenses and checked weights and measurements, sixth board collected sales taxes. Some cities such as Taxila had autonomy to issue their own coins. The city counsel had officers who looked after public welfare such as maintenance of roads, public buildings, markets, hospitals, educational institutions etc. The official head of the village was Gramika (in towns Nagarika). The city counsel also had some magisterial powers. The taking of Census was regular process in the Mauryan administration. The village officials (Gramika) and municipal officials (Nagarika) were responsible enumerating different classes of people in the Mauryan empire such as traders, agriculturists, smiths, potters, carpenters etc. and also cattle, mostly for taxation purposes. These vocations consolidated as castes, a feature of Indian society that continues to influence the Indian politics till today.

Economy

For the first time in South Asia, political unity and military security allowed for a common economic system and enhanced trade and commerce, with increased agricultural productivity. The previous situation involving hundreds of kingdoms, many small armies, powerful regional chieftains, and internecine warfare, gave way to a disciplined central authority. Farmers were freed of tax and crop collection burdens from regional kings, paying instead to a nationally administered and strict-but-fair system of taxation as advised by the principles in the Arthashastra. Chandragupta Maurya established a single currency across India, and a network of regional governors and administrators and a civil service provided justice and security for merchants, farmers and traders. The Mauryan army wiped out many gangs of bandits, regional private armies, and powerful chieftains who sought to impose their own supremacy in small areas. Although regimental in revenue collection, Maurya also sponsored many public works and waterways to enhance productivity, while internal trade in India expanded greatly due to new-found political unity and internal peace.

Under the Indo-Greek friendship treaty, and during Ashoka's reign, an international network of trade expanded. The Khyber Pass, on the modern boundary of Pakistan and Afghanistan, became a strategically important port of trade and intercourse with the outside world. Greek states and Hellenic kingdoms in West Asia became important trade partners of India. Trade also extended through the Malay peninsula into Southeast Asia. India's exports included silk goods and textiles, spices and exotic foods. The external world came across new scientific knowledge and technology with expanding trade with the Mauryan Empire. Ashoka also sponsored the construction of thousands of roads, waterways, canals, hospitals, rest-houses and other public works. The easing of many over-rigorous administrative practices, including those regarding taxation and crop collection, helped increase productivity and economic activity across the Empire.

In many ways, the economic situation in the Mauryan Empire is analogous to the Roman Empire of several centuries later. Both had extensive trade connections and both had organizations similar to corporations. While Rome had organizational entities which were largely used for public state-driven projects, Mauryan India had numerous private commercial entities. These existed purely for private commerce and developed before the Mauryan Empire itself.

Religion
Throughout the period of empire, Brahmanism was an important religion. The Mauryans favored Brahmanism as well as Jainism and Buddhism. Minor religious sects such as Ajivikas also received patronage. A number of Hindu texts were written during the Mauryan period.

According to a Jain text from 12th century, Chandragupta Maurya followed Jainism after retiring, when he renounced his throne and material possessions to join a wandering group of Jain monks and in his last days, he observed the rigorous but self-purifying Jain ritual of santhara (fast unto death), at Shravana Belgola in Karnataka. Samprati, the grandson of Ashoka, also patronized Jainism. Samprati was influenced by the teachings of Jain monks like Suhastin and he is said to have built 125,000 derasars across India. Some of them are still found in the towns of Ahmedabad, Viramgam, Ujjain, and Palitana. It is also said that just like Ashoka, Samprati sent messengers and preachers to Greece, Persia and the Middle East for the spread of Jainism, but, to date, no evidence has been found to support this claim.

The Buddhist texts Samantapasadika and Mahavamsa suggest that Bindusara followed Hindu Brahmanism, calling him a "Brahmana bhatto" ("monk of the Brahmanas").

Magadha, the centre of the empire, was also the birthplace of Buddhism. Ashoka initially practised Brahmanism but later followed Buddhism; following the Kalinga War, he renounced expansionism and aggression, and the harsher injunctions of the Arthashastra on the use of force, intensive policing, and ruthless measures for tax collection and against rebels. Ashoka sent a mission led by his son Mahinda and daughter Sanghamitta to Sri Lanka, whose king Tissa was so charmed with Buddhist ideals that he adopted them himself and made Buddhism the state religion. Ashoka sent many Buddhist missions to West Asia, Greece and South East Asia, and commissioned the construction of monasteries and schools, as well as the publication of Buddhist literature across the empire. He is believed to have built as many as 84,000 stupas across India, such as Sanchi and Mahabodhi Temple, and he increased the popularity of Buddhism in Afghanistan and Thailand. Ashoka helped convene the Third Buddhist Council of India's and South Asia's Buddhist orders near his capital, a council that undertook much work of reform and expansion of the Buddhist religion. Indian merchants embraced Buddhism and played a large role in spreading the religion across the Mauryan Empire.

Society
The population of South Asia during the Mauryan period has been estimated to be between 15 and 30 million. According to Tim Dyson, the period of the Mauryan Empire saw the consolidation of caste among the Indo-Aryan people who had settled in the Gangetic plain, increasingly meeting tribal people who were incorporated into their evolving caste-system, and the declining rights of women in the Indo-Aryan speaking regions of India, though "these developments did not affect people living in large parts of the subcontinent."

Architectural remains

The greatest monument of this period, executed in the reign of Chandragupta Maurya, was the old palace at Paliputra, modern Kumhrar in Patna. Excavations have unearthed the remains of the palace, which is thought to have been a group of several buildings, the most important of which was an immense pillared hall supported on a high substratum of timbers. The pillars were set in regular rows, thus dividing the hall into a number of smaller square bays. The number of columns is 80, each about  meters high. According to the eyewitness account of Megasthenes, the palace was chiefly constructed of timber, and was considered to exceed in splendour and magnificence the palaces of Susa and Ecbatana, its gilded pillars being adorned with golden vines and silver birds. The buildings stood in an extensive park studded with fish ponds and furnished with a great variety of ornamental trees and shrubs. Kauṭilya's Arthashastra also gives the method of palace construction from this period. Later fragments of stone pillars, including one nearly complete, with their round tapering shafts and smooth polish, indicate that Ashoka was responsible for the construction of the stone columns which replaced the earlier wooden ones.

During the Ashokan period, stonework was of a highly diversified order and comprised lofty free-standing pillars, railings of stupas, lion thrones and other colossal figures. The use of stone had reached such great perfection during this time that even small fragments of stone art were given a high lustrous polish resembling fine enamel. This period marked the beginning of Buddhist architecture.  Ashoka was responsible for the construction of several stupas, which were large domes and bearing symbols of Buddha. The most important ones are located at Sanchi, Bodhgaya, Bharhut, and possibly Amaravati Stupa. The most widespread examples of Mauryan architecture are the Ashoka pillars and carved edicts of Ashoka, often exquisitely decorated, with more than 40 spread throughout the Indian subcontinent.

The peacock was a dynastic symbol of Mauryans, as depicted by Ashoka's pillars at Nandangarh and Sanchi Stupa.

Natural history

The protection of animals in India was advocated by the time of the Maurya dynasty; being the first empire to provide a unified political entity in India, the attitude of the Mauryas towards forests, their denizens, and fauna in general is of interest.

The Mauryas firstly looked at forests as resources. For them, the most important forest product was the elephant. Military might in those times depended not only upon horses and men but also battle-elephants; these played a role in the defeat of Seleucus, one of Alexander's former generals. The Mauryas sought to preserve supplies of elephants since it was cheaper and took less time to catch, tame and train wild elephants than to raise them. Kautilya's Arthashastra contains not only maxims on ancient statecraft, but also unambiguously specifies the responsibilities of officials such as the Protector of the Elephant Forests.

The Mauryas also designated separate forests to protect supplies of timber, as well as lions and tigers for skins. Elsewhere the Protector of Animals also worked to eliminate thieves, tigers and other predators to render the woods safe for grazing cattle.

The Mauryas valued certain forest tracts in strategic or economic terms and instituted curbs and control measures over them. They regarded all forest tribes with distrust and controlled them with bribery and political subjugation. They employed some of them, the food-gatherers or aranyaca to guard borders and trap animals. The sometimes tense and conflict-ridden relationship nevertheless enabled the Mauryas to guard their vast empire.

When Ashoka embraced Buddhism in the latter part of his reign, he brought about significant changes in his style of governance, which included providing protection to fauna, and even relinquished the royal hunt. He was the first ruler in history to advocate conservation measures for wildlife and even had rules inscribed in stone edicts. The edicts proclaim that many followed the king's example in giving up the slaughter of animals; one of them proudly states:

However, the edicts of Ashoka reflect more the desire of rulers than actual events; the mention of a 100 'panas' (coins) fine for poaching deer in royal hunting preserves shows that rule-breakers did exist. The legal restrictions conflicted with the practices freely exercised by the common people in hunting, felling, fishing and setting fires in forests.

Contacts with the Hellenistic world

Foundation of the Empire
Relations with the Hellenistic world may have started from the very beginning of the Maurya Empire. Plutarch reports that Chandragupta Maurya met with Alexander the Great, probably around Taxila in the northwest:

Reconquest of the Northwest (c. 317–316 BCE)
Chandragupta ultimately occupied Northwestern India, in the territories formerly ruled by the Greeks, where he fought the satraps (described as "Prefects" in Western sources) left in place after Alexander (Justin), among whom may have been Eudemus, ruler in the western Punjab until his departure in 317 BCE or Peithon, son of Agenor, ruler of the Greek colonies along the Indus until his departure for Babylon in 316 BCE.

Conflict and alliance with Seleucus (305 BCE)

Seleucus I Nicator, the Macedonian satrap of the Asian portion of Alexander's former empire, conquered and put under his own authority eastern territories as far as Bactria and the Indus (Appian, History of Rome, The Syrian Wars 55), until in 305 BCE he entered into a confrontation with Emperor Chandragupta:

Though no accounts of the conflict remain, it is clear that Seleucus fared poorly against the Indian Emperor as he failed to conquer any territory, and in fact was forced to surrender much that was already his. Regardless, Seleucus and Chandragupta ultimately reached a settlement and through a treaty sealed in 305 BCE, Seleucus, according to Strabo, ceded a number of territories to Chandragupta, including eastern Afghanistan and Balochistan.

Marriage alliance

Chandragupta and Seleucus concluded a peace treaty and a marriage alliance in 303 BCE. Chandragupta received vast territories and in a return gave Seleucus 500 war elephants, a military asset which would play a decisive role at the Battle of Ipsus in 301 BCE. In addition to this treaty, Seleucus dispatched an ambassador, Megasthenes, to Chandragupta, and later Deimakos to his son Bindusara, at the Mauryan court at Pataliputra (modern Patna in Bihar). Later, Ptolemy II Philadelphus, the ruler of Ptolemaic Egypt and contemporary of Ashoka, is also recorded by Pliny the Elder as having sent an ambassador named Dionysius to the Mauryan court.

Mainstream scholarship asserts that Chandragupta received vast territory west of the Indus, including the Hindu Kush, modern-day Afghanistan, and the Balochistan province of Pakistan. Archaeologically, concrete indications of Mauryan rule, such as the inscriptions of the Edicts of Ashoka, are known as far as Kandahar in southern Afghanistan.

The treaty on "Epigamia" implies lawful marriage between Greeks and Indians was recognized at the State level, although it is unclear whether it occurred among dynastic rulers or common people, or both.

Exchange of presents
Classical sources have also recorded that following their treaty, Chandragupta and Seleucus exchanged presents, such as when Chandragupta sent various aphrodisiacs to Seleucus:

His son Bindusara 'Amitraghata' (Slayer of Enemies) also is recorded in Classical sources as having exchanged presents with Antiochus I:

Greek population in India

An influential and large Greek population was present in the northwest of the Indian subcontinent under Ashoka's rule, possibly remnants of Alexander's conquests in the Indus Valley region. In the Rock Edicts of Ashoka, some of them inscribed in Greek, Ashoka states that the Greeks within his dominion were converted to Buddhism:

Fragments of Edict 13 have been found in Greek, and a full Edict, written in both Greek and Aramaic, has been discovered in Kandahar. It is said to be written in excellent Classical Greek, using sophisticated philosophical terms. In this Edict, Ashoka uses the word Eusebeia ("Piety") as the Greek translation for the ubiquitous "Dharma" of his other Edicts written in Prakrit:

Buddhist missions to the West (c. 250 BCE)

Also, in the Edicts of Ashoka, Ashoka mentions the Hellenistic kings of the period as recipients of his Buddhist proselytism, although no Western historical record of this event remains:

Ashoka also encouraged the development of herbal medicine, for men and animals, in their territories:

The Greeks in India even seem to have played an active role in the spread of Buddhism, as some of the emissaries of Ashoka, such as Dharmaraksita, are described in Pali sources as leading Greek ("Yona") Buddhist monks, active in Buddhist proselytism (the Mahavamsa, XII).

Subhagasena and Antiochos III (206 BCE)

Sophagasenus was an Indian Mauryan ruler of the 3rd century BCE, described in ancient Greek sources, and named Subhagasena or Subhashasena in Prakrit. His name is mentioned in the list of Mauryan princes, and also in the list of the Yadava dynasty, as a descendant of Pradyumna. He may have been a grandson of Ashoka, or Kunala, the son of Ashoka. He ruled an area south of the Hindu Kush, possibly in Gandhara. Antiochos III, the Seleucid king, after having made peace with Euthydemus in Bactria, went to India in 206 BCE and is said to have renewed his friendship with the Indian king there:

Timeline

322 BCE: Chandragupta Maurya  conquers the Nanda Empire, founding Maurya dynasty.
317–316 BCE: Chandragupta Maurya conquers the Northwest of the Indian subcontinent.
305–303 BCE: Chandragupta Maurya gains territory by defeating the Seleucid Empire.
298–269 BCE: Reign of Bindusara, Chandragupta's son. He conquers parts of Deccan, southern India.
269–232 BCE: The Mauryan Empire reaches its height under Ashoka, Chandragupta's grandson.
261 BCE: Ashoka conquers the kingdom of Kalinga.
250 BCE: Ashoka builds Buddhist stupas and erects pillars bearing inscriptions.
184 BCE: The empire collapses when Brihadratha, the last emperor, is killed by Pushyamitra Shunga, a Mauryan general and the founder of the Shunga Empire.

In literature
According to Vicarasreni of Merutunga, Mauryans rose to power in 312 BC.

List of rulers 

Rulers-

See also
 Magadha
Pradyota dynasty
Gupta Empire
History of India
List of Hindu empires and dynasties

Notes

Sources

 
 
 Burton Stein (1998). A History of India (1st ed.), Oxford: Wiley-Blackwell.
 
 
 
 
 
 J. E. Schwartzberg (1992). A Historical Atlas of South Asia. University of Oxford Press.
 John Keay (2000). India, a History. New York: HarperCollins Publishers.

External links

Livius.org: Maurya dynasty
Extent of the Empire
Ashoka's Edicts

 
Ancient empires and kingdoms of India
Ancient Hindu kingdoms
Iron Age countries in Asia
Iron Age cultures of South Asia
Dynasties of Bengal
Former empires
Ancient history of Pakistan
Ancient history of Afghanistan
Jain empires and kingdoms
Buddhist dynasties of India
Magadha
Kingdoms of Bihar
4th century BC in India
3rd century BC in India
2nd century BC in India
320s BC establishments
States and territories established in the 4th century BC
States and territories disestablished in the 2nd century BC
4th-century BC establishments in India
2nd-century BC disestablishments
Former monarchies of South Asia
History of Nepal
4th-century BC establishments in Nepal
2nd-century BC disestablishments in Nepal